Abdul-Aziz Yakubu (born 10 November 1998) is a Ghanaian footballer who plays as a forward for Chinese Super League club Wuhan Three Towns on loan from Primeira Liga club Rio Ave.

Club career
Yakubu began his senior career Vizela it started in. He scored his first goal for Vizela in Taça de Portugal against Vilaverdense.In August 2018 joined Vitória Guimarães B on loan.Yakubu transferred to the Vitória Guimarães first team in 2019.On loan in 2020 joined Estoril.Abdul-Aziz Yakubu scored 12 goals in the 2020-21 season he greatly contributed to Estoril's winning Liga Portugal 2.On July 31, 2021, he joined Rio Ave in Liga Portugal 2 for the 2021–22 season.Aziz Yakubu made his debut against Rio Ave on 8 August 2021 against Académica in Liga Portugal 2 on 8 August 2021 and was included in the game from the reserve at the 72nd minute.Yakubu scored his first goal with Rio Ave in the Taça da Liga match against C.D. Santa Clara in the 16th minute. Yakubu enjoyed the trophy once again with Rio Ave in the 2021-22 season, becoming the champion in Liga Portugal 2 and promoted to Primeira Liga.Permanently transferred to Rio Ave in Vitória Guimarães in the summer of 2022.Yakubu scored his first goal in Primeira Liga with Rio Ave of the 2022-23 season on August 19, 2022 at recorded in the 73rd minute of the game that finished 2-2 against Estoril.

In March 2023, Yakubu joined Chinese Super League club Wuhan Three Towns on loan.

Career statistics

Club

Notes

References

External links

 Zerozero Profile

1998 births
Living people
People from Tamale, Ghana
Ghanaian footballers
Association football forwards
Liga Portugal 2 players
Campeonato de Portugal (league) players
Primeira Liga players
Chinese Super League players
F.C. Vizela players
Vitória S.C. B players
Vitória S.C. players
G.D. Estoril Praia players
Rio Ave F.C. players
Wuhan Three Towns F.C. players
Ghanaian expatriate footballers
Ghanaian expatriate sportspeople in Portugal
Expatriate footballers in Portugal
Ghanaian expatriate sportspeople in China
Expatriate footballers in China